Andrew Gantner House is a historic home located at Boonville, Cooper County, Missouri. It was built about 1856, and is a one-story, roughly cut and dressed sandstone block dwelling. It was enlarged by subsequent historic additions, both stone and frame, to a roughly U-shaped plan.

It was listed on the National Register of Historic Places in 1990.

References

Houses on the National Register of Historic Places in Missouri
Houses completed in 1856
Houses in Cooper County, Missouri
National Register of Historic Places in Cooper County, Missouri
1856 establishments in Missouri
Boonville, Missouri